Stewartville was an unincorporated place in eastern Contra Costa County, California that is now a ghost town. It was a mining town for the nearby coal mines.

A post office operated at Stewartville from 1882 to 1902.  The place was named for William Stewart, coal mine owner.

References

Ghost towns in California
Ghost towns in the San Francisco Bay Area
Company towns in California
Former settlements in Contra Costa County, California
Populated places established in 1882